Cachoeira dos Índios is the westernmost municipality in the Brazilian state of Paraíba.  As of 2020, it had a population of 10,305.

References 

Municipalities in Paraíba